Erving Walker  (born January 17, 1990) is an American professional basketball player, who lastly played for Zamalek.

High school career
During his sophomore season in Christ the King High school in New York in 2006, Walker was named to the 2006 1st annual Boost Mobile Elite24.

College career
Erving played basketball for the Florida gators basketball team from 2008-2012 as a point guard wearing number 11. He was named to the 2012 All-SEC Second team during his senior season. He held the all-time leading assists record at Florida (547). The record was surpassed in 2018. He is still the fourth scoring leader (1,777 points).

During his senior season the Gators lost to Louisville in the Elite Eight of the NCAA Tournament

Walker averaged 12.1 points, 4.7 assists and 2.8 rebounds in his senior year at Florida

In 2012, "Walker was charged with petit theft and resisting an officer without violence at 1 a.m. ET March 30 after Gainesville Police Department officers apprehended him following a foot chase that also involved several police cars." "Judge Walter M. Green withheld adjudication and ordered Walker to pay the fine by September 27. The state dropped an additional misdemeanor charge of resisting arrest without violence as part of the agreement."

Professional career
After going undrafted in the 2012 NBA draft, he signed with Prima Veroli of the Italian Second Division in the summer of 2012. He played 20 games, averaging 17.9 points and 3.6 assists per game.

In October 2013, after passing a tryout period, he signed a one-year deal with Stelmet Zielona Góra. He parted ways with them on January 28, 2014. On February 5, 2014, he signed with Élan Chalon for the rest of the 2013–14 season.

On June 23, 2014, he signed with JDA Dijon Basket for the 2014–15 season. Over 37 French League games played, he averaged 17.6 points, 6.1 assists and 3.1 rebounds per game on 41% shooting from the field. However, Dijon finished in 10th place not being able to make playoffs.

On July 8, 2015, he signed a one-year contract with Büyükçekmece Basketbol of the Turkish Basketball Super League.

On July 25, 2016, Walker signed with SIG Strasbourg for the 2016–17 season.

On June 27, 2017, Walker returned to Büyükçekmece Basketbol for the 2017–18 season. He averaged 18.5 points, 2.8 rebounds and 5.1 assists per game. On July 6, 2018, Walker signed with Pınar Karşıyaka.

The Basketball Tournament
In 2017, Walker played for the Kentucky Kings of The Basketball Tournament. Walker averaged 20.0 PPG to help his team advance to the second round of the tournament. The Basketball Tournament is an annual $2 million winner-take-all tournament broadcast on ESPN.

In TBT 2018, Walker suited up for Team Fancy. In 2 games, he averaged 11.5 points, 2.5 assists, 2 rebounds per game. Team Fancy reached the second round before falling to Boeheim's Army.

Career statistics

EuroLeague

|-
| style="text-align:left;"| 2013–14
| style="text-align:left;"| Zielona Góra
| 10 || 0 || 13.1 || .377 || .214 || .857 || 1.1 || 1.5 || .0 || .0 || 5.8 || 4.8
|- class="sortbottom"
| style="text-align:center;" colspan=2 | Career
| 10 || 0 || 13.1 || .377 || .214 || .857 || 1.1 || 1.5 || .0 || .0 || 5.8 || 4.8

Personal life
Erving has recently featured in a YouTube series on Grit Media  in a series called deployed. This also features other basketball players including Romeo Travis and Josh Childress

References

External links

 Erving Walker at draftexpress.com
 Erving Walker at espn.com
 Erving Walker at eurobasket.com
 Erving Walker at euroleague.net
 Erving Walker at lnb.fr
 

1990 births
Living people
African-American basketball players
American expatriate basketball people in France
American expatriate basketball people in Italy
American expatriate basketball people in Poland
American expatriate basketball people in Turkey
American men's basketball players
Basketball players from New York City
Basket Zielona Góra players
Büyükçekmece Basketbol players
Élan Chalon players
Florida Gators men's basketball players
JDA Dijon Basket players
Karşıyaka basketball players
Point guards
Zamalek SC basketball players
SIG Basket players
Sportspeople from Brooklyn
Veroli Basket players
21st-century African-American sportspeople